"No Woman, No Cry" is a reggae song by Bob Marley and the Wailers.  The song was recorded in 1974 and released on the studio album Natty Dread.

The live recording of this song from the 1975 album Live! was released as a single and is the best-known version; it was later included on several compilation albums, including the greatest hits compilation Legend. It was recorded at the Lyceum Theatre in London on 17 July 1975 as part of his Natty Dread Tour.

The live version of the song ranked No. 37 on Rolling Stones 500 Greatest Songs of All Time.

Writing and composition
Although Bob Marley is widely believed to have written the song (the lyrics are highly personalised and mention Georgie making cornmeal porridge, Marley's favourite dish), or at least the melody, a songwriter credit was given to Vincent Ford, a friend of Marley's who ran a soup kitchen in Trenchtown, the ghetto of Kingston, Jamaica, where Marley grew up (he specifically mentions the Government Yards of Trench Town, a public housing project).  The royalty payments received by Ford ensured his efforts would continue.
The original studio version of the song used a drum machine. Jean Roussel provided the arrangement and Hammond organ parts for this recording.
The title and main refrain, "No Woman, No Cry", means "Woman, don't cry". The lyric is sometimes misunderstood outside Jamaica to mean "if there is no woman, there is no reason to cry". The lyric is rendered "No, woman, nuh cry" in Jamaican patois. The "nuh" is pronounced with a short schwa vowel (a "mumbled" vowel, often represented as "uh" in spelling) and represents a clitic ("weakened") form of "no".

Charts

Certifications

Fugees version

"No Woman, No Cry" was covered by American hip hop group Fugees. It was released in November 1996 as the fourth single from their second studio album, The Score (1996). The song was produced by Wyclef Jean and Lauryn Hill. Fugees' version of the track features Jean on lead vocals and changes the lyric "in a government yard in Trenchtown" to "in a government yard in Brooklyn." An official remix of the track, featuring Stephen Marley, was included on the group's third release, Bootleg Versions. Jean later recorded a solo version of the track for his 2003 anthology Greatest Hits.

Fugees' version was successful worldwide, peaking atop the New Zealand Singles Chart for two weeks, reaching number-two in the United Kingdom and becoming a top 40 hit in 13 additional countries. It did not chart on the US Billboard Hot 100 due to not receiving a physical release in the US, which at the time was a requirement for songs to appear on the Hot 100. It instead charted on the Billboard Hot 100 Airplay chart, peaking at number 38.

Critical reception
Larry Flick from Billboard wrote, "Fugees continue to offer the hip-hop masses a thorough musical history—this time targeting Bob Marley's classic reggae hit "No Woman, No Cry". Steve Marley's heartwarming vocal similarity to his dad and Wyclef's present-day Brooklyn, N.Y.- project-sensitive lyrics successfully bind new jacks to danceball's reggae origins. The video for the single continues the legacy: Lauryn Hill gets her unique vocal swerve on with the Melody Makers in scenes reminiscent of Rita, Judy, and Marcia's I-Three days, and early Wailers footage interspersed with the collaborators' studio time supplies an overall tear-jerking, historic experience."

Track listings
 UK CD1
 "No Woman, No Cry" (LP version) - 4:03
 "No Woman, No Cry" (Remix) - 3:55
 "No Woman, No Cry" (Remix instrumental) - 3:55
 "Killing Me Softly" (Live) - 4:25

 UK CD2
 "Don't Cry, Dry Your Eyes" - 5:03
 "Don't Cry, Dry Your Eyes" (Instrumental) - 5:03
 "No Woman, No Cry" (LP version) - 4:03
 "A Change Is Gonna Come" (Live) - 6:04

Charts

Weekly charts

Year-end charts

Certifications

Tems version

"No Woman, No Cry" was covered by Nigerian singer, Tems and Marvel Music for the soundtrack of the Marvel Cinematic Universe (MCU) film Black Panther: Wakanda Forever. It was produced by Ludwig Göransson and released on 25 July 2022 as the lead single off the EP. It received generally positive receptions from fans who viewed the teaser trailer and on debuted at number one on the Billboard World Digital Song Sales chart.

Charts

References

External links
 

1974 singles
1996 singles
2022 singles
Bob Marley songs
Joan Baez songs
Fugees songs
Tems (singer) songs
Number-one singles in New Zealand
Song recordings produced by Salaam Remi
Songs about poverty
Songs about Jamaica
Song recordings produced by Frank Farian
Spunge songs
1973 songs
Quotations from music
1974 neologisms
Island Records singles
Ruffhouse Records singles
Hollywood Records singles